Downtown Columbus may refer to:

Downtown Columbus, Ohio
Downtown Columbus, Georgia